The Indestructible Man may refer to:
 The Indestructible Man (novel), a novel written in the Doctor Who scenario
 Indestructible Man, an American black-and-white second-feature science fiction film starring Lon Chaney, Jr., made in 1956